Šolen z brega is a novel by Slovenian author Zoran Hočevar. It was first published in 1997.

See also
List of Slovenian novels

References
Šolen z brega, Zalozbacf.si, accessed 19 July 2012

Slovenian novels
1997 novels